Astel is a Senegalese-French short drama film, directed by Ramata-Toulaye Sy and released in 2021. The film stars Hawa Mamadou Dia, a young girl in Senegal who loves to accompany her father (Cherif Amadou Diallo) when he herds cows, but is forced to conform to more traditional "women's work" with her mother (Khady Diallo) after a shepherd's leering looks at her lead her father to realize she is no longer safe.

The film premiered at the 2021 Toronto International Film Festival, where it was the winner of the Share Her Journey award. It was subsequently screened at the 2022 Clermont-Ferrand International Short Film Festival, where it won the SACD Award and a Special Jury Prize.

References

External links

2021 films
2021 short films
French coming-of-age films
French drama short films
Senegalese drama films
Senegalese short films
2020s French films